Sergio Hipperdinger (born 14 January 1992) is an Argentine footballer who plays for Freamunde  as a forward.

References

1992 births
People from General José de San Martín, Chaco
Living people
Argentine footballers
Argentine Primera División players
Quilmes Atlético Club footballers
S.C. Freamunde players
Argentine expatriate footballers
Expatriate footballers in Portugal
Liga Portugal 2 players
Association football forwards
Argentine people of Volga German descent
Sportspeople from Chaco Province